William Leonard Baker (16 May 1831 – 7 January 1893) was an Australian politician who was a member of the Legislative Assembly of Western Australia from 1890 until his death, representing the seat of East Kimberley.

Baker was born in Newport, Wales. He emigrated to Australia in the early 1850s, during the Victorian gold rush, and later went to Queensland, where he was involved in mining ventures in Charters Towers and near the Cape River. Baker came to Western Australia in 1885, during a gold rush in the Kimberley, and opened a store in Wyndham. He was elected to parliament at the 1890 general election, which was the first to be held for the Legislative Assembly. Baker died in Fremantle in January 1893, having suffered from pleurisy and bronchitis for some time. He was the first member of the Legislative Assembly to die in office.

Notes

References

1831 births
1893 deaths
Members of the Western Australian Legislative Assembly
People from Newport, Wales
Welsh emigrants to colonial Australia
19th-century Australian politicians